Kálmán Balogh (born 18 January 1959) is a Hungarian cimbalom player and leader of Kalman Balogh's Gypsy Cimbalom Band.

History 

Balogh is a Hungarian cimbalom player part of a lineage of Hungarian Gypsy musicians. A graduate of Franz Liszt Academy of Music of Budapest, he completed his studies in 1980 under supervision of Ferenc Gerencsér. Balogh studied the Gypsy music in Europe and Asia for several years. He has completed many tours throughout the world with various ensembles, including five tours in North America. He has performed and toured with many folk bands and has recorded dozens of albums with them and as a solo artist. He was a featured performer in numerous major European festivals and venues featuring Gypsy music. Balogh has performed on concerts in North America. He has performed with the Philadelphia Orchestra, Brooklyn Philharmonic Orchestra, New World Symphony, Oregon Symphony, Austin Symphony and the Band, Oregon Festival Orchestra. He also played at many North American festivals and clubs. He has played with several musicians like Arild Andersen, Patrice Heral, Ferenc Snetberger, Peter Ralchev, Ivo Papazov and Iva Bittova. In 1985 he was awarded the Hungarian distinction of "Young Master of Folk Arts", and two years later he won second prize in the Aladár Rácz cimbalom-competition. As an artist he has performed with Hungarian bands as Jánosi, Ökrös, Téka, Méta, Muzsikás, Zsarátnok, Vízöntő, Vasmalom, the Swedish Orient-Express, the Dutch Sultan and Ot Azoj, the English Transglobal Underground, the American Peter Ogi and the Joel Rubin Jewish Ensemble.  

Balogh was musical director of the "Magneten Gypsy Show" of Andre Heller and also performed on a CD with the Budapest Festival Orchestra playing Brahms Hungarian Dances. In 1997, he performed with the Brooklyn Philharmonic Orchestra and also with the Miami Philharmonic Orchestra. On 10–11 March 2010, Balogh presented his musical project The Other Europeans at the EU conference "Projects in Favour of Roma Culture", in Brussels, Belgium.

Kálmán Balogh and the Gipsy Cimbalom Band 
Balogh regularly plays with the Gipsy Cimbalom Band.  The group performs Hungarian folk music, as well as classical music and jazz both at home and abroad.

Discography

Albums
 Balogh Kálmán & the Gipsy Cimbalom Band: Roma vándor (1995)
 Gypsy Music From Hungarian Villages (1996)
 Balogh Kálmán & the Gipsy Cimbalom Band: Gipsy Colours (1997)
 The Art of The Gipsy Cimbalom, ARC Music Productions Int. Ltd. (1998)
 Balogh Kálmán és a Romano Kokalo: Gipsy Colours, FolkEurópa (1999)
 Balogh Kálmán - Gipsy Jazz, Rounder Records Corp (1999)
 Balogh Kálmán & the Gipsy Cimbalom Band: AromA, FolkEurópa (2003)
 David Murray, Kovács Ferenc és Balogh Kálmán & a Gipsy Cimbalom Band, Fonó (2005)
 Balogh Kálmán: Karácsonyi Örömzene, Gryllus (2005)
 Balogh Kálmán - Korpás Éva: Ó, szép fényes hajnalcsillag – Hungarian folksongs for Christmas, FolkEurópa (2005)
 Balogh Kálmán & the Gipsy Cimbalom Band: Aven Shavale, FolkEurópa (2007)
 Balogh Kálmán & the Gipsy Cimbalom Band: Live in Germany (2007)
 Balogh Kálmán & the Gipsy Cimbalom Band: Délibáb, FolkEurópa (2010)

Contributions

 Szvorák Katalin: Dalvándorlás, Hungaroton (1986)
 Márta István: Kapolcs riadó (1987)
 Muzsikás: Ősz az idő (1989)
 Téka: Feljön a nap (1989)
 Vízöntő: Gitania Express, Hungaroton-Gong Kft. (1990)
 Vízöntő: Best,Quint (1991)
 Cimbalomos Világtalálkozó (1991)
 Transylvanian Portraits,Koch World (1992)
 Zengő (1994)
 Ökrös – Balogh Kálmán: Hippoglassus Hippoglassus, Around Sound Studios(1994)
 Ando Drom (1995)
 Jánosi együttes: Rapszódia - LISZT és BARTÓK források, Hungaroton Classic LTD., (1995)
 Budapest Ragtime Band: Trubadurr, Hungaroton Classic LTD.,  (1995)
 Cserepes Károly: Kivándorlás (1896-1914) (1996)
 Üsztürü Zenekar: Szárazfának muzsikája, Fonó Records 1997)
 Joel Rubin Jewish Music Ensemble - Beregovski’s Khasene (1997)
 Ökrös: Bonchida, háromszor (1997)
 Kallós Zoltán: Idegen földre ne siess, (1997)
 Ot Azoj Klezmerband: The Heart of Klezmer,Oreade Music (1998)
 Gypsy Folk Music From Transylvania, Rounder Select (1999)
 Kiss Ferenc: Nagyvárosi bujdosók, Etnofon (1999)
 Zengő: Víg óra (1999)
 Jézus születése FOLK-OPERA 2000 (2000)
 Johann Sebastian Bach: Revisited, BMC Records (2000)
 Cintece ale romanilor din Ungria (2000)
 Vasmalom II., Vasmalom III., Periferic Records (2001)
 International Cimbalom Festival, FRÉA Records (2001)
 Kiss Ferenc: A Héttorony hangjai, Etnofon (2001)
 Ökrös: Elindultam szép hazámból (2001)
 Herczku Ágnes: Arany és kék szavakkal, Fonó Records (2002)
 Mitsoura: Mitsoura, Bartha Bt. (2003)
 Nem megyünk a másvilágra: Gömör – Kishont megye falusi bandáinak emlékére (2003)
 Tükrös: Vígan legyünk!, FolkEurópa (2003)
 LezKlez & Kálmán Balogh: „Ostinato”, LezKlez (2003)
 Üsztürü: Az Öregeké, FolkEurópa (2004)
 Tizenkét Banda: Erdélyország, FolkEurópa (2004)
 Fonó együttes: Túlparton, Hungaroton Records (2004)
 Válogatás: Hangvető 2004-2005, FolkEurópa (2004)
 Parno Graszt: Járom az utam, Fonó (2004)
 Zerkula János és a Szászcsávásiak, Balogh Kálmán, Vizeli Balázs, FolkEurópa (2004)
 Szvorák Katalin: Áthallások - magyar népdalvariánsok, Hungaroton Records (2004)
 Szvorák Katalin: Pünkösd Közép-Európában, Hungaroton Records (2005)
 Hangvető válogatás 2006-2007, FolkEurópa (2005)
 Agócs Gergely: Kilencz Ballada, Fonó (2005)
 Ökrös: Így kell járni..., Gryllus (2006)
 Kovács Ferenc: Beli buba, Gramy Records (2006)
 Berecz András: Sinka ének (2006)
 Vágtázó Csodaszarvas: Tiszta forrás, Fonó (2006)
 Ökrös Csaba és a Dobogó kő (2006)
 Csillagok, csillagok..., FolkEurópa(2007)
 We are Magyar! 2007 (2007)
 Berkó együttes, Etnofon (2007)
 Kaláka - Arany János (2007)
 Gryllus Vilmos: Dalok 4 - Magyar népdalok (2009)
 Both Miklós: Radnóti, Gryllus (2009)
 Rendhagyó Prímástalálkozó, FolkEurópa (2009) 
 Kovács Ferenc: My Roots
 Youth Without Youth
 Celtic Lullabies
 Joel Rubin
 Hepta
 Festival d'été de Québec
 Sultan: 20 Jaar
 Balkanswingband Sultan: Obstinato
 World Music
 Orientexpressen: Mahala
 Music of East Europe
 Udrub: Suhanás
 Internationales Hackbrettfestival 2
 Gypsy Music
 World of Gypsies
 The Dulcimer Collection
 Johannes Brahms (1833-1897)
 Dresch Quartet: Archie Shepp
 Sultan: Obsédé

Awards
 1985 Honorary Young Master of Folk Art
 1999 eMeRTon award
 2005 Artisjus prize
 2007 Kodály prize
 2009 Bezerédj prize

References

External links 
 Official website 

Hungarian musicians
Cimbalom players
1959 births
Living people